"Save Me, Save Me" is a song written by Barry Gibb and Albhy Galuten in 1977. It was recorded by the group Network from New York City. The flipside was "Not Love at All". This song is the first track credited to Gibb and Galuten. George Bitzer was hired to play synthesizers and keyboards and he later worked with Barry and Andy Gibb. It was recorded in Criteria Studios, Miami around April 1977, same session as Samantha Sang recorded her well-known hit "Emotion". The song was issued in Netherlands and the B-side was "Holly". John Vinci on vocals Richie Cerniglia as "Richie C" on guitar Mike Maniscalco as "Mike Coxton" on keyboardHowie Blume as "Howard Davidson" on bass Butch Poveromo as "Jean Paul Gaspar" on percussion, Mike Ricciardella — drums and George Bitzer on keyboard, synthesizer.

Cover versions
 Frankie Valli recorded this song as a follow up to "Grease" also written by Barry. It appeared on his album Frankie Valli... Is the Word.  According to Billboard, Valli's vocal performance generates similar enthusiasm as his performance of "Grease." Record World said that "It has a bit of Bee Gees' flavor with Valli's vocals set off perfectly by Bob Gaudio's production."
 Teri DeSario covered this track and released on the album Pleasure Train (1978), along with "Ain't Nothing Gonna Keep Me From You" also written by Barry
 Rare Earth recorded this song after they recorded "Warm Ride" credited to Barry, Robin & Maurice Gibb.
 Dusty Springfield covered "Save Me, Save Me" for Living Without Your Love.

References

Songs written by Barry Gibb
Song recordings produced by Barry Gibb
1977 songs
1977 singles
Disco songs
Funk songs
Epic Records singles
Song recordings produced by Albhy Galuten
Songs written by Albhy Galuten